Saint Sophia Cathedral in Kyiv, Ukraine, is an architectural monument of Kyivan Rus. The former cathedral is one of the city's best known landmarks and the first heritage site in Ukraine to be inscribed on the World Heritage List along with the Kyiv Cave Monastery complex. Aside from its main building, the cathedral includes an ensemble of supporting structures such as a bell tower and the House of Metropolitan. In 2011 the historic site was reassigned from the jurisdiction of the Ministry of Regional Development of Ukraine to the Ministry of Culture of Ukraine. One of the reasons for the move was that both Saint Sophia Cathedral and Kyiv Pechersk Lavra are recognized by the UNESCO World Heritage Program as one complex, while in Ukraine the two were governed by different government entities. It is currently a museum.

The complex of the cathedral is the main component and museum of the National Sanctuary "Sophia of Kyiv" which is the state institution responsible for the preservation of the cathedral complex as well as four other historic landmarks across the nation.

History
The cathedral is named after the 6th-century Hagia Sophia (Holy Wisdom) cathedral in Constantinople (present-day Istanbul), which was dedicated to the Holy Wisdom rather than to a specific saint named Sophia.
The first foundations were laid in 1037 or 1011, but the cathedral took two decades to complete. According to one theory, Yaroslav the Wise sponsored the construction of the Saint Sophia Cathedral in 1037 to celebrate his decisive victory over the nomadic Pechenegs in 1036 (who thereafter were never a threat to Kyiv). According to Dr. Nadia Nikitenko, a historian who has studied the cathedral for 30 years, the cathedral was founded in 1011, under the reign of Yaroslav's father, Grand Prince of Kievan Rus, Vladimir the Great. This has been accepted by both UNESCO and Ukraine, which officially celebrated the 1000th anniversary of the cathedral during 2011. The structure has 5 naves, 5 apses, and (quite surprisingly for Byzantine architecture) 13 cupolas. It is surrounded by two-tier galleries from three sides. Measuring , the exterior used to be faced with plinths. On the inside, it retains mosaics and frescos from the 11th century, including a dilapidated representation of Yaroslav's family, and the Orans.

Originally the cathedral was a burial place of the Kievan rulers including Vladimir Monomakh, Vsevolod Yaroslavich and the cathedral's founder Yaroslav I the Wise, although only the latter's grave survived to this day (see picture).

After the pillaging of Kyiv by Andrei Bogolyubsky of Vladimir-Suzdal in 1169, followed by the Mongol invasion of Rus' in 1240, the cathedral fell into disrepair. It was greatly rebuilt in its modern splendor in the 16th century when the Polish–Lithuanian Commonwealth was trying to unite Catholic and Orthodox churches. Following the 1595-96 Union of Brest, the Cathedral of Holy Sophia belonged to the Ukrainian Greek Catholic Church which commissioned the repair work and the upper part of the building was thoroughly rebuilt, modeled by the Italian architect Octaviano Mancini in the distinct Ukrainian Baroque style, while preserving the Byzantine interior, keeping its splendor intact. The work continued under the Cossack Hetman Ivan Mazepa until 1767. During this period around Holy Sophia Cathedral a bell tower, a monastery canteen, a bakery, a "House of Metropolitan", the western gates (Zborovski gates), a Monastic Inn, a Brotherhood campus and a bursa (seminary) were all erected. All of these buildings, as well as the cathedral after the reconstruction, have distinctive features of Ukrainian Baroque.

After the Russian Revolution of 1917 and during the Soviet anti-religious campaign of the 1920s, the government plan called for the cathedral's destruction and transformation of the grounds into a park "Heroes of Perekop" (after a Red Army victory in the Russian Civil War in Crimea). The cathedral was saved from destruction (the opposite St. Michael's Golden-Domed Monastery was destroyed in 1935) primarily with the effort of many scientists and historians. Nevertheless, in 1934, Soviet authorities confiscated the structure from the church, including the surrounding 17th–18th-century architectural complex and designated it as an architectural and historical museum.

Since the late 1980s Soviet, and later Ukrainian, politicians promised to return the building to the Orthodox Church. Due to various schisms, and factions within the Church the return was postponed as all Orthodox and the Greek-Catholic Churches lay claim to it. Although all of the Orthodox churches have been allowed to conduct services at different dates, at other times they are denied access. A severe incident was the funeral of Patriarch Volodymyr of the Ukrainian Orthodox Church – Kyiv Patriarchate in 1995 when riot police were forced to prevent the burial on the premises of the museum and a bloody clash took place. After events such as those no religious body has yet been given the rights for regular services. The complex now remains a secular museum of Ukraine's Christianity, with most of its visitors being tourists.

On 21 August 2007, the Holy Sophia Cathedral was named one of the Seven Wonders of Ukraine, based on votes by experts and the internet community.

Gallery

Cathedral complex

 Sophia Cathedral
 Bell tower
 House of the Metropolitan
 Refectory Church
 Brotherhood building
 Bursa (high school)
 Consistory
 Southern entrance tower
 Zaborovski Gate
 Cells
 Monastic Inn
 Memorial Stela of Yaroslav's library

See also

 Architecture of Kyivan Rus
 List of UNESCO World Heritage Sites in Ukraine
 Holy Sophia Cathedral in Novgorod
 Saint Sophia Cathedral in Polotsk

Notes

References

External links
 3D-model of Sophia Cathedral (3.2 Mb)
  Official Website of the museum
 Holy Sophia Cathedral - Kyiv History Site
  Sobory.ru - information about the cathedral
 Travel.kyiv.org - information for tourists
 Mosaics and frescoes of St. Sophia Cathedral
 Софійський собор in Wiki-Encyclopedia Kyiv
  Must see places in Kiev - Holy Sophia Cathedral
 Mosaics and Frescoes of Saint Sophia Cathedral of Kyiv. Photoalbum. Kyiv, Mistectvo, 1975.
Saint Sophia Cathedral within Google Arts & Culture

Cathedrals in Kyiv
Sophia Square
Eastern Orthodox cathedrals in Ukraine
Church buildings converted to a different denomination
Museums in Kyiv
Religious museums in Ukraine
Art museums and galleries in Ukraine
Shevchenkivskyi District, Kyiv
11th-century Eastern Orthodox church buildings
Churches completed in 1740
Sophia
Sophia
Sophia
Church buildings with domes
Sophia Cathedral in Kiev
Baroque architecture in Kyiv
Baroque church buildings in Ukraine
Volodymyrska Street
Symbols of Kyiv
Architectural monuments of Ukraine of national importance in Kyiv
Sophia of Kyiv